Elk County Catholic High School is a private, Roman Catholic high school in St. Marys, Pennsylvania, United States. It is located in the Roman Catholic Diocese of Erie.

Background

Elk County Catholic High School was established in 1962 by the Catholic Diocese of Erie, Pennsylvania. The predecessor to ECCHS was the Central Catholic High School, located nearby on Church and Center Streets.

Athletics
Elk County Catholic is notable as the Pennsylvania Interscholastic Athletic Association (PIAA) Class A basketball champion in 2006 led by Jesse Bosnik. Lady Crusaders softball won the PIAA Class A Championship in 2015. The basketball team also reached the PIAA Class A semifinals during the 2008-2009 season led by Nate Higgins and defensive specialist Joe Jacob. The school's cross country program have captured numerous district titles.

The school's colors are maroon and gold, and the mascot is the Crusader.

Notable alumni
Edward Charles "Shy" Meyer: 29th Chief of Staff of the United States Army

References

External links
 Elk County Catholic High School

Catholic secondary schools in Pennsylvania
Educational institutions established in 1962
Schools in Elk County, Pennsylvania
St. Marys, Pennsylvania
1962 establishments in Pennsylvania